Leverett's Chapel Independent School District is a public school district located in northwestern Rusk County, Texas that serves the unincorporated communities of Leverett's Chapel and Laird Hill. 
In 2017 it founded its academic rodeo team ,and in 2021 has started a junior high basketball team.

Academic achievement
In 2009, the school district was rated "academically acceptable" by the Texas Education Agency.

Schools
Leverett's Chapel High (Grades 9–12)
Leverett's Chapel Junior High (Grades 6–8)
Leverett's Chapel Elementary (Grades PK–5)

Special programs

Athletics
Leverett's Chapel High School plays six-man football. Leverett's Chapel has also been known for sending multiple HS Boys Cross-Country Teams to state and earning a 3rd-place finish in the 2004 State Cross-Country Championships.

The 2016 Leverett's Chapel HS Girls' Volleyball team advanced to the State Class A Semifinals, falling to Tioga in three sets, 25–18, 25–15, 25–19

See also

List of school districts in Texas

References

External links

School districts in Rusk County, Texas